Star Sports refers to several current or former Asian sports networks owned by The Walt Disney Company:
 Star Sports (East Asian TV channel)
 Star Sports (Indian TV network)
 Fox Sports (Southeast Asian TV network)